The Stroc Castle is a cultural heritage monument in Stroc, Vushtrri, Kosovo.

History
Gradina Castle, in the village of Stroc, shows evidence of settlement in prehistory, late antiquity, and the Early Middle Ages. All evidence from the organization and remains found indicate a local ancient relic.<

See also 
 Viciano
 List of monuments in Vushtrri

References

Historic sites in Kosovo
Cultural heritage monuments in Vushtrri